Fernando Pereira (born 22 October 1959) is a Venezuelan former footballer. He competed in the men's tournament at the 1980 Summer Olympics.

References

External links
 
 

1959 births
Living people
Venezuelan footballers
Venezuela international footballers
Olympic footballers of Venezuela
Footballers at the 1980 Summer Olympics
Place of birth missing (living people)
Association football midfielders
20th-century Venezuelan people